Stanley Herbert Michael Callagher (18 April 1927 – 21 April 2011) was a New Zealand rowing coxswain who won a silver medal at the 1954 British Empire and Commonwealth Games.

Early life and family
Born on 18 April 1927, Callagher was the son of Harold Stanislaus Callagher and Bridget Callagher (née Fee). He married Noeleen Evelyn Ryan, and the couple went on to have four children.

Rowing
Callagher represented New Zealand at the 1954 British Empire and Commonwealth Games in Vancouver, where he coxed the men's four, which consisted of Bruce Culpan, Kerry Ashby, Bill Tinnock and Murray Ashby. The crew won the silver medal, finishing 2.1 seconds behind the Australian boat.

Later life and death
Callagher died in Takapuna on 21 April 2011, having been predeceased by his wife, Noeleen, in 1997. His ashes were buried at Mangere Lawn Cemetery.

References

1927 births
2011 deaths
New Zealand male rowers
Coxswains (rowing)
Rowers at the 1954 British Empire and Commonwealth Games
Commonwealth Games silver medallists for New Zealand
Commonwealth Games medallists in rowing
Burials at Mangere Lawn Cemetery
Medallists at the 1954 British Empire and Commonwealth Games